The Orient-Institut Istanbul is a research institute of the Max Weber Foundation based in Istanbul, Turkey. It studies Ottoman, Mediterranean and Turkish culture, history and society. It was separated from the Orient-Institut Beirut as an independent institute in 2009.

References 

2009 establishments in Turkey
Historiography of the Ottoman Empire
Historiography of Turkey
Max Weber Foundation
Research institutes in Turkey